The Progressive Union was a small left-wing party in the French Fourth Republic close to the French Communist Party.

References

Defunct political parties in France
Left-wing parties in France
Political parties with year of establishment missing
Political parties with year of disestablishment missing